Minidoka is a name of Dakota Sioux origin meaning "a fountain or spring of water". It is a name shared by several geographic locations in the Magic Valley region of southern Idaho in the United States:

 Minidoka, Idaho, a town in Minidoka County
 Minidoka County, Idaho
 Minidoka Dam, located north of Acequia, Idaho
 Minico High School (also known as Minidoka County High School), near Rupert, Idaho
 Minidoka National Forest, a former U.S. national forest
 Minidoka National Historic Site, an American concentration camp where Japanese Americans were imprisoned during World War II
 Minidoka Project, an irrigation project
 Minidoka Ranger District, a district of Sawtooth National Forest
 Minidoka: 937th Earl of One Mile Series M, an Edgar Rice Burroughs novella first published in 1998

See also